A cabinet reshuffle or shuffle occurs when a head of government rotates or changes the composition of ministers in their cabinet, or when the Head of State changes the head of government and a number of ministers. They are more common in parliamentary systems than in systems where cabinet heads must be confirmed by a separate legislative body, and occur frequently in autocratic systems without suitable checks-and-balances.

A shadow cabinet reshuffle may take place to change positions in a shadow cabinet.

In parliamentary systems
Cabinet reshuffles happen in parliamentary systems for a variety of reasons. Periodically, smaller reshuffles are needed to replace ministers who have resigned, retired or died. Reshuffles are also a way for a premier to "refresh" the government, often in the face of poor polling numbers; remove poor performers; and reward supporters and punish others. It is common after elections, even if the party in power is retained, as the prime minister's reading of public opinion as evidenced by the election may require some change in policy, in addition to any changes resulting from the retirement or defeat of individual ministers at the election. Similarly,  prime ministers entering office from the same party as the previous one might appoint a very different ministry than their predecessor to reflect a change in policies and priorities; an example is Gordon Brown's government, formed on 28 June 2007 after the departure of Tony Blair the previous day.

A reshuffle also provides an opportunity to create, abolish and rename departments (and ministerial posts) and to reassign responsibilities among departments. This may be done to reflect new priorities or for reasons of efficiency.

Canada 

 2018 Canadian cabinet reshuffle
 2021 Canadian cabinet reshuffle

India 

 2021 Indian cabinet reshuffle

United Kingdom 

 Night of the Long Knives (1962)
 2006 British cabinet reshuffle
 2012 British cabinet reshuffle
 2014 British cabinet reshuffle
 2018 British cabinet reshuffle
 2020 British cabinet reshuffle
2021 British cabinet reshuffle
July 2022 British cabinet reshuffle
September 2022 British cabinet reshuffle
October 2022 British cabinet reshuffle
2023 British cabinet reshuffle

Shadow Cabinet reshuffle 

 2016 British shadow cabinet reshuffle
 May 2021 British shadow cabinet reshuffle
 November 2021 British shadow cabinet reshuffle

In other democratic systems
Cabinet reshuffles are far less common in systems where members of the Cabinet are not drawn from the legislative branch. In such systems there is a far larger pool of viable candidates to choose a cabinet from. Members of such cabinets are usually chosen on account of their qualifications to run a specific portfolio, so moving these cabinet members to different portfolios at a later time usually makes little sense. 

In the United States (a presidential system), it would be very unusual for a president to reassign multiple cabinet secretaries to new positions, especially since a United States Cabinet member moved to a new position within the cabinet needs to be confirmed in the new role by the United States Senate—this alone is seen as a powerful deterrent against U.S. presidents initiating major cabinet reshuffles. On an individual basis, however, U.S. Cabinet members will occasionally change departments—for example, Norman Mineta served as Secretary of Commerce under Bill Clinton before becoming Secretary of Transportation for Clinton's successor, George W. Bush.

In France (a semi-presidential system within the framework of the contemporary French Fifth Republic), the Prime Minister may tend their resignation to the President of the Republic, who then selects a successor. The new Prime minister then proposes a list of ministers to the President, who may approve the list or request changes. After the list is approved, the new government is put in office. The same practice may be used to change several ministers in one sweep while retaining the same Prime Minister, in which case the President simply selects the incumbent as their own successor. Such successive governments with one same Prime Minister are named after the head of government and numbered (for instance "Rocard I and "Rocard II"  or "Ayrault I and Ayrault II"  see List of prime ministers of France).

In undemocratic systems
Cabinet reshuffles occur at the pleasure of monarchs or dictators in autocratic systems, which lack the checks-and-balances of systems with greater citizen or legislative control.

See also
 2006 United Kingdom Cabinet reshuffle
 List of people who have held multiple United States Cabinet-level positions
 Musical chairs
 Night of the Long Knives (1962)

References

External links